Azubuike Michael Egwu professionally known as Zubby Michael is a Nigerian film actor and movie producer. He is known for his role in Three Windows, Royal Storm and Professional Lady. His first appearance was in the movie titled Missing Rib but known for The Three Widows where he played the lead role.

Life and career 
Zubby was born in Anambra State. He attended Nnamdi Azikiwe University where he obtained a degree in mass communication.

He began acting in Yola at a young age. His first movie appearance was in a movie titled Missing Rib but became popular for his lead role in The Three Windows. Zubby has appeared in several other films.

Political career 
On 25 November 2019 he was appointed into a political position as the special adviser on media to the Anambra State governor Willie Obiano. He was awarded a certificate of recognition for his contribution to the City Radio 89.7 FM youth empowerment initiative in Anambra State.

Awards and nominations

Acting awards

Other awards

Pictorials

Interviews

Selected filmography

References 
25. Zubby Michael Hosts Davido In Onitsha, Anambra State

Living people
Date of birth missing (living people)
Nigerian male film actors
Nigerian film producers
Actors from Anambra State
Nigerian actor-politicians
Igbo male actors
Nnamdi Azikiwe University alumni
Nigerian politicians
Year of birth missing (living people)